Joséphine Houssaye (1840 – 1914) was a French painter.

She was a pupil of Tony Robert-Fleury at the Académie Julian. Houssaye exhibited her work at the Palace of Fine Arts and The Woman's Building at the 1893 World's Columbian Exposition in Chicago, Illinois.

Her painting The Lesson, was included in the 1905 book Women Painters of the World.

References

External links
 Joséphine Houssaye on artnet

1840 births
1914 deaths
French women painters
Académie Julian alumni
19th-century French painters
19th-century French women artists